Cactoblastis bucyrus is a species of snout moth in the genus Cactoblastis. It was described by Harrison Gray Dyar Jr. in 1922, and is known from Argentina (Tucumán, Tapia, Mendoza, Catamarca, Andalgalá).

The larvae feed on Trichocereus, Echinopsis and Denmoza species.

References

Phycitini
Moths described in 1922